is a football stadium in Yonago, Tottori Prefecture, Japan. It has been called Chubu Yajin Stadium for the naming rights.

It is one of the home stadiums of football club Gainare Tottori.

External links
Official site

Gainare Tottori
Yonago, Tottori
2012 establishments in Japan
Sports venues completed in 2012
Sports venues in Tottori Prefecture
Football venues in Japan